Julie Marie is a given name. Notable people with the name include:

 Julie Marie Berman (born 1983), American actress
 Julie Marie Vinter Hansen (1890–1960), Danish astronomer

Compound given names
Feminine given names